Lor is a commune in the Aisne department in Hauts-de-France  in northern France. It is around 30 km north of Reims.

Population

See also
Communes of the Aisne department

References

Communes of Aisne
Aisne communes articles needing translation from French Wikipedia